Brilley is a small village and civil parish in Herefordshire, England, close to the border with Wales, and about  north-east of the Welsh border town of Hay-on-Wye. In 1968 a new primary school was built next door to the village hall; the school was closed in 2007 because of low pupil numbers, and later demolished in 2014 to expand the carpark for the village hall.

References

External links

 Brilley with Michaelchurch Community site

Villages in Herefordshire